John B. "Cap" Grier (February 6, 1901 – June 30, 1991) was an American sports shooter. He competed in the 50 m rifle event at the 1924 Summer Olympics.

Grier was inducted into the Delaware Sports Museum and Hall of Fame in 1979.

References

External links
 

1901 births
1991 deaths
American male sport shooters
Olympic shooters of the United States
Shooters at the 1924 Summer Olympics
Place of birth missing
20th-century American people